National Dance Week (NDW) is an annual event in the United States sponsored by the United Dance Merchants of America to increase public awareness and appreciation of various forms of dance. The event is coordinated by an organization under the same  name  headquartered in Pittsburgh, Pennsylvania, which operates under the sponsorship of the UDMA and currently seeks for the 501(c)(3) nonprofit organization status

The Coalition for National Dance Week was formed in 1981 by a group of dance related organizations to bring greater recognition to dance as an art form.  Since 1991 the NDW is sponsored by the UDMA.

NDW volunteers host more than a thousand events nationwide during the observation.

National Dance Week 2009 
Dance Week 2009 was from April 24-May 3, 2009.

National Dance Week 2007 
National Dance Week 2007 was from April 20 through the 29th. Activities scheduled for 2007 included community dance performances, free classes, an essay contest, and an attempt to break the Guinness World Record for the "Largest Ballet Class a la barre" sponsored by the Oregon Ballet Foundation.

See also
International Dance Day – April 29
National Dance Day – last Saturday in July

References

External links 
National Dance Week - Official Website
A week worth dancing about: dancers celebrate coast to coast - National Dance Week, Dance Magazine
Presidential Commendation
Bay Area National Dance Week

Dance organizations
Dance education in the United States
Dance festivals in the United States